Gustav Gottenkieny (8 May 1896 – September 1959) was a Swiss footballer. He played in fourteen matches for the Switzerland national football team between 1920 and 1925.

References

External links
 

1896 births
1959 deaths
Swiss men's footballers
Switzerland international footballers
People from Winterthur
Association football defenders
FC Winterthur players
FC Fribourg players
Grasshopper Club Zürich players
Olympic footballers of Switzerland
Footballers at the 1924 Summer Olympics
Olympic medalists in football
Olympic silver medalists for Switzerland
Medalists at the 1924 Summer Olympics
Sportspeople from the canton of Zürich